Abbadia is an Italian surname. The Italian word, as Badia means "Abbey". Notable people with the surname include:

Luigia Abbadia (1821–1896), Italian opera singer
Natale Abbadia (1792–1861), Italian composer

See also

Badia (disambiguation)
Abbadie, French surname
Abbadia (disambiguation)

Italian-language surnames